The King's Pawn Game is any chess opening starting with the move:
1. e4

It is the most popular opening move in chess, followed by the Queen's Pawn Game.

Details about the move and the game plan
White opens with the most popular of the twenty possible opening moves. Although effective in winning for White (54.25%), it is not quite as successful as the four next most common openings for White: 1.d4 (55.95%), 1.Nf3 (55.8%), 1.c4 (56.3%), and 1.g3 (55.8%). Since nearly all openings beginning 1.e4 have names of their own, the term King's Pawn Game, unlike Queen's Pawn Game, is rarely used to describe the opening of the game.

Chess grandmaster Bobby Fischer said that the King's Pawn Game is "Best by test", and proclaimed that "With 1.e4! I win."

Opening categorization and continuations

King's Pawn Games are further classified by whether Black responds with 1...e5 or not. Openings beginning with 1.e4 e5 are called Double King's Pawn Games (or Openings), Symmetrical King's Pawn Games, or Open Games – these terms are equivalent. Openings where Black responds to 1.e4 with a move other than 1...e5 are called Asymmetrical King's Pawn Games or Semi-Open Games.

The Encyclopedia of Chess Openings (ECO) classifies all King's Pawn Games into volumes B or C: volume C if the game starts with 1.e4 e6 (the French Defence) or 1.e4 e5; volume B if Black answers 1.e4 with any other move. The rare instances where the opening does not fall into a more specific category than King's Pawn Game are included in codes B00 (includes the Nimzowitsch Defence and unusual moves after 1.e4), C20 (includes Alapin's Opening and unusual moves after 1.e4 e5), C40 (includes the Latvian Gambit and unusual moves after 1.e4 e5 2.Nf3), and C50 (includes the Hungarian Defence, the Giuoco Pianissimo, and unusual moves after 1.e4 e5 2.Nf3 Nc6 3.Bc4).

The Black responses which are given one or more chapters in the ECO are given below, ranked in order of popularity according to ChessBase.

Popular continuations

1... c5, the Sicilian Defence, is the most common continuation in modern practice. The Sicilian Defence allows Black to fight for the center by preparing to meet a d2–d4 advance with ...cxd4. The Sicilian is among the sharpest and most analysed openings in chess, and it has eighty chapters, B20–B99, set aside for it in ECO.
1... e5 leads to the classical Open Games, which includes openings like the Ruy Lopez, King's Gambit, Italian Game, Scotch Game and Petrov's Defence. Also in this opening, Black is ready to meet a d2–d4 advance with exd4. These openings are covered in chapters C20–C99 in ECO.
1... e6 is the French Defence, covered in chapters C00–C19 in ECO. Black's restrained response allows White to play 2.d4. This gives White a spatial advantage, with two pawns in the center to Black's one (after the usual 2... d5) and open lines for both of the bishops to black blocking in the light squared bishop and stopping it from developing. One or the other player will usually resolve the center tension, either by Black playing ...dxe4 or White advancing with e5. In the latter case, Black typically works to undermine White's pawn center with ...c5 and/or ...f6.
1... c6 is the Caro–Kann Defence, covered in chapters B10–B19 in ECO. Like the French, this is also considered to be a solid reply, but Black will often need to surrender control over the center (e.g., after 2.d4 d5 3.Nc3 Black usually plays 3...dxe4). On the other hand, the light-squared bishop will usually not wind up trapped behind its own pawns, as is common in the French.
1... d6 is usually played with the intention of playing the Pirc Defence (1.e4 d6 2.d4 Nf6 3.Nc3 g6, ECO codes B07–B09), a hypermodern defence in which Black allows White to construct a dominant center, with the intention of subverting it later. It can also lead to the Modern Defence, Pribyl System or Philidor Defence.
1... g6 is the Modern Defence. This is related to the Pirc Defence, which it can lead to. These openings allow White to build up a pawn center with 2.d4, but Black will develop the king's bishop to g7 and strike back at the center. These openings are covered in chapters B06–B09 in ECO, with the Modern Defence covered in chapter B06.
1... d5, the Scandinavian Defence or Center Counter Defence, is a direct strike at the pawn at e4, forcing the situation in the center. After 2.exd5 Qxd5 3.Nc3, however, White gains time by attacking Black's prematurely developed queen. Alternatively, Black can play 2...Nf6 (the Marshall Gambit), when White chooses between 3.d4 Nxd5 4.c4 with a spatial advantage, or 3.c4, when Black usually offers a gambit with either 3...c6 or 3...e6. The Scandinavian is covered in chapter B01 in ECO.
1... Nf6 is the Alekhine Defence, which invites White to attack the knight with 2.e5. Black is often forced to spend time moving the knight several times as it is chased around the board, all the while allowing White to build up a broad pawn center. Black counts on the pawns becoming overextended so that he can later undermine them. The Alekhine is covered in chapters B02–B05 of ECO.

Uncommon continuations
Apart from these eight responses, all other replies from Black are covered together in ECO chapter B00 ("Uncommon King's Pawn Opening"). A few of these are not entirely obscure, and have received extensive analysis.
1... Nc6 is the Nimzowitsch Defence. After 2.d4, there are two distinctive main lines: 2...e5, favoured by British grandmaster Tony Miles, and 2...d5, introduced and often played by the influential Latvian-Danish player and writer Aron Nimzowitsch (1886–1935).
1... b6 is Owen's Defence, preparing to develop Black's bishop to b7 to put pressure on White's center.
1... a6 is the St. George Defence. The opening gained some attention after Miles used it to defeat Anatoly Karpov in 1980.
1... g5 is the Borg Defence ("Grob" backwards) or Basman Defence, often played by IM Michael Basman. The move weakens the  severely, but according to Modern Chess Openings (MCO), Black is only somewhat worse.

Rare continuations
The remaining replies to 1.e4 are very rare, and have not received significant and serious attention by masters. MCO does not cover them, considering them so bad as not to merit discussion. These openings sometimes lead to wild and exciting games, and are occasionally employed by weaker players to get better trained opponents "out-of-book". Some have exotic names. Such openings are listed below along with instances where they have been used by strong players.
 1... h6, called the Carr Defence in Unorthodox Chess Openings. This defence has also been used by Michael Basman, and is likely to transpose to the Borg Defence after 2.d4 g5.
 1... a5, the Corn Stalk Defence. United States chess player Preston Ware played the Corn Stalk in eleven recorded tournament games from 1880 to 1882, winning four and losing seven. Its chief fault is the very early and therefore potentially unnecessary development of a peripheral piece.
 1... Na6, called the Lemming Defence in Unorthodox Chess Openings, develops the knight to an inferior square.
 1... h5, the Goldsmith Defence or Pickering Defence. All this move achieves is to waste a tempo and weaken the kingside. It is the reversed version of the Kadas Opening.
 1... f6 is known as the Barnes Defence after Thomas Wilson Barnes. This move is clearly inferior, taking away the f6-square from the knight and weakening Black's kingside, although Barnes managed to defeat Paul Morphy with this defence in 1858.
 1... f5 is called the Duras Gambit in Unorthodox Chess Openings. This is a pawn sacrifice which gives Black a lead in development after 2.exf5 Nf6, but without much additional compensation for the sacrificed pawn. Another move in this position is 2...Kf7, but after the move 3.Qh5+, Black has to play g6 and totally wreck his kingside. The line was played three times in an exhibition match between Ossip Bernstein and Oldřich Duras.
 1... Nh6, the Adams Defence or Wild Bull Defence. It can transpose to the old hippo system.

See also
Open Game
Semi-Open Game
List of chess openings

References

Bibliography

 
 

Chess openings